Patrick Bashir Baladi (born 25 December 1971) is an English actor and musician. He is best known for playing Neil Godwin in the BBC sitcom The Office, Michael Jackson in the Sky 1 drama Stella and Stephen Holmes in the ITV thriller Marcella.

Early life and education
Baladi was born in Sutton Coldfield, West Midlands. His father was a Syrian gynaecologist and obstetrician, and his mother a midwife. Baladi grew up with his siblings, Sara, Charlotte, Sophie and Nicholas. He was educated at Stonyhurst College, where he was the first student to win the Charles Laughton Prize for his roles in Joseph and the Amazing Technicolor Dreamcoat (as Pharaoh) and Amadeus (as Mozart). After school he went on to train as an actor at the Central School of Speech and Drama.

Career
Baladi is known for his portrayal of David Brent's nemesis, Neil Godwin, in the BBC's hit comedy-mockumentary series, The Office. He appeared in the second and final series of the award-winning show, as well as the subsequent The Office Christmas Special.

In addition to The Office, Baladi has appeared in various films and television shows, including Bodies, Kidnap and Ransom, as Philip Shaffer, ITV (2011),  Alpha Male, Bridget Jones: The Edge of Reason, Beyond The Pole, POW, Lady Audley's Secret, Grafters, Silent Witness, The International, Party Animals, Mistresses, Rev., Sensitive Skin, Privates, Stella and Line of Duty.

Baladi portrayed Dodi Al-Fayed in the 2007 television docudrama Diana: Last Days of a Princess. In 2008 he had a small role in the romantic comedy Last Chance Harvey, appearing alongside Emma Thompson. He is also a stage actor who has appeared in numerous productions by the Royal Shakespeare Company, such as Hamlet and Much Ado About Nothing. He starred in the comedy No Heroics as Excelsor.

Personal life
In 2007, Baladi married Gemma Walker, whom he met on the set of A Touch of Frost. They married in St Lucia and had one daughter, Ava.

Baladi is now married to Janie Erith. Their daughter Kensa was born on 4 September 2016. 

In 2017 Baladi set up a booth at the Malthouse Emporium, an antiques and furniture centre in Stroud in Gloucestershire.

Filmography

Film

Television

Theatre

References

External links
 

1971 births
Living people
Alumni of the Royal Central School of Speech and Drama
English male film actors
English male television actors
People educated at Stonyhurst College
English people of Syrian descent
Male actors from Birmingham, West Midlands